Lohjan Jääankat (Lohja Iceducks), shorter Ankat (Ducks) were an ice hockey team which was founded in 1992 in Lohja. Jääankat played season 2008–2009 2. Divisioona south group, and was promoted at the end of the season to Suomi-sarja. Promotion was secured March 11, when Kirkkonummen Salamat lost to Porvoon Hunters in Suomi-sarjan promotion. March 2011 team was disbanded.

History
Lohjan Jääankat was founded in early 1992. Team's name has nothing to do with Anaheim Ducks which was founded a year later.

Team started ice hockey in the fourth division, and the first official game was played on December 5, 1992. Season 1992–1993 brought besides one draw only victories, and ducks were promoted to third division for the next season.

After playing 12 seasons third division Jääankat was promoted to 2. Divisioona in spring 2005. Four years later, in spring 2009 Ankat won their division losing only 2 games on entire season.

Spring 2011 team was disbanded.

Current Team
(On November 4, 2010)

Team Management 
 Head Coach: Marko Halonen 
 GM: Mikko Heino 
 GM: Kurt-Matias Heinonen 
 GM: Markku Norja 
 Maintenance: Kari Eriksson

External links 
Official website

Ice hockey clubs established in 1992
Ice hockey clubs disestablished in 2011
1992 establishments in Finland
2011 disestablishments in Finland
Ice hockey teams in Finland
Lohja